Shahi River is a river in western India in Gujarat whose origin is Near Bhervi village. Its basin has a maximum length of 38 km. The total catchment area of the basin is 163 km2.

References

Rivers of Gujarat
Rivers of India